The Paeligni or Peligni were an Italic tribe who lived in the Valle Peligna, in what is now Abruzzo, central Italy.

History
The Paeligni are first mentioned as a member of a confederacy that included the Marsi, Marrucini, and Vestini, with which the Romans came into conflict in the Second Samnite War, 325 BC. Like other Oscan-Umbrian populations, they were governed by supreme magistrates known as meddixes. Their religion included deities, such as the Dioscuri, Cerfum (a water god), and Anaceta (the Roman Angitia), a goddess associated with snakes.

On the submission of the Samnites, they all came into alliance with Rome in 305-302 BC, the Paelignians having fought hard against even this degree of subjection. Each member of the confederacy entered the alliance with Rome as an independent unit, and in none was there any town or community politically separate from the tribe as a whole. Thus the Vestini issued coins of its own in the 3rd century; each of them appears in the list of the allies in the Social War. How purely Italic in sentiment these communities of the mountain country remained appears from the choice of the mountain fortress of Corfinium as the rebel capital. It was renamed Vitellio, the Oscan form of Italia, a name which appears, written in Oscan alphabet, on the coins struck there in 90 BC. The Paeligni were granted Roman Citizenship after the Social War, and that was the beginning of the end of their national identity,  as they began to adopt Roman culture and language.

Gentes of Paeligni origin 
 Ovidia gens

Language

The known Paeligni inscriptions show that the dialect spoken by these tribes was substantially the same from the northern boundary of the Frentani to some place in the upper Aternus valley not far from Amiternum, and that this dialect closely resembled the Oscan of Lucania and Samnium, though presenting some peculiarities of its own, which warrant, perhaps, the use of the name North Oscan. , "on to what lies before you". The last sentence of the interesting epitaph from which this phrase is taken may be quoted as a specimen of the dialect; the stone was found in Corfinio, the ancient Corfinium, and the very perfect style of the Latin alphabet in which it is written shows that it cannot well be earlier than the last century BC: ,  The form  (2nd plural perfect indicative) is closely parallel to the inflection of the same person in Sanskrit and of quite unique linguistic interest.

The name Paeligni may belong to the NO-class of ethnica (see Marrucini), but the difference that it has no vowel before the suffix suggests that it may rather be parallel with the suffix of Latin . If it has any connection with Latin , "concubine", it is conceivable that it meant “halfbreeds” and was a name coined in contempt by the conquering Sabines, who turned the touta marouca into the community of the Marrucini. But, when unsupported by direct evidence, even the most tempting etymology is an unsafe guide. 

Paelignian and this group of inscriptions generally form a most important link in the chain of the Italic dialects, as without them the transition from Oscan to Umbrian would be completely lost. The unique collection of inscriptions and antiquities of Pentima and the museum at Sulmona were both created by Professor Antonio de Nino, whose devotion to the antiquities of his native district rescued every single Paelignian monument that we possess.

Fate
None of the Latin inscriptions of the district need be older than Sulla, but some of them both in language and script show the style of his period (e.g. 3087, 3137); and, on the other hand, as several of the native inscriptions, which are all in the Latin alphabet, show the normal letters of the Ciceronian period, there is little doubt that, for religious and private purposes at least, the Paelignian dialect lasted down to the middle of the 1st century BC.

See also
 List of ancient Italic peoples

References

Attribution

Ancient Italic peoples
Osco-Umbrian languages
Languages extinct in the 1st century BC
Languages attested from the 2nd century BC